Presses universitaires de France (PUF, English: University Press of France), founded in 1921 by Paul Angoulvent (1899–1976), is a French publishing house.

Recent company history 
The financial and legal structure of the Presses Universitaires de France were completely restructured in 2000 and the original cooperative structure was abandoned. Companies that took stakes in PUF included Flammarion Publishing (17% in 2000, 18% currently) and insurer Maaf Assurances (9%, 8% currently). In 2006, another insurance giant Garantie Mutuelle des Fonctionnaires (GMF) injected capital into the PUF, taking a 16,4% stake in the publisher. A similar tendency toward the constitution of an oligopoly has been observed by French newspapers, with titles like Le Monde, Libération or even L'Humanité accepting to turn themselves toward private financing.

Que sais-je? 
Almost all French students know the collection Que sais-je? (a quote from Montaigne: "What do I know?"), created in 1941 by Paul Angoulvent. The collection is based on a unique format of 128 pages, in which specialists are invited to ruminate a specific theme.  Today, there are close to 4,000 titles, by 2,500 authors, constituting the world's largest paperback encyclopedia covering a broad range of subjects. Many of the titles have been translated into up to forty-three languages, while the PUF have sold around 160 million books (2004 figures) since first published. Its ISSN number is 0768-0066.

Collections 
 Bibliothèque de philosophie contemporaine
 L'écologie en questions
 Écrits
 Éducation et société
 Épiméthée
 Éthique et philosophie morale
 Intervention philosophique
 Leviathan
 Le lien social
 Lignes d'art
 Le Nœud gordien
 Major
 Nouvelle Clio
 Perspectives critiques
 Quadrige
 Que sais-je?
 Science, histoire, société
 Sociologie d'aujourd'hui
 Thémis
 La Vie des Idées

References

External links
 

Book publishing companies of France
1921 establishments in France
Publishing companies established in 1921